Kendra Preston Leonard (born June 11, 1974, New Orleans) is an American musicologist. She specialized in women in music and music in screen history in 20th century France, Britain, and America.

Education
She studied as a cellist at the University of North Carolina School of the Arts, The Peabody Conservatory, the Guildhall School of Music and Drama, and the University of Miami before studying musicology at the University of Cincinnati. She received her PhD from the University of Sunderland.

She held the Beinecke Rare Book and Manuscript Library’s Thornton Wilder Fellowship from Yale University (2009). She taught musicology at Westminster Choir College from 2009-2011 and is a frequent speaker and workshop leader at colleges and universities. She is the Executive Director of the Silent Film Sound and Music Archive. Librettist of Marie Curie Learns to Swim, a one act opera with music by Jessica Rudman. 
She has written numerous book chapters, articles, conference presentations, and reviews.

Awards and honors
She won the inaugural Judith Tick Fellowship from the Society for American Music (2013-2014) for research on Louise Talma.

Publications
Books 
 Louise Talma: A Life in Composition, Ashgate Publishing, 2014
 Shakespeare, Madness and Music: Scoring Insanity in Cinematic Adaptations, Scarecrow Press, 2009
 The Conservatoire Américain: a History, Scarecrow Press, 2007

Edited collections
 Contributing editor, Buffy, Ballads, and Bad Guys Who Sing: Music in the Worlds of Joss Whedon, Scarecrow Press, 2010

See also
Women in musicology

References

External links
www.kendraprestonleonard.com

1974 births
Living people
American musicologists
American women musicologists
People from New Orleans
21st-century American women musicians